Gukchae Park is a park that is located in Jung-gu, Daegu South Korea. It commemorates the government bond compensation movement, which was an ethnic movement that began in 1907, during the period when Korea was occupied by the Japanese Empire. Construction of the park began in March 1998 and was completed in December 1999.

References 
 http://tour.daegu.go.kr/kor/see/spot/park/1186873_4504.asp 
 http://www.gukchae.com/park.html

Parks in Daegu
Jung District, Daegu